The 66th World Science Fiction Convention (Worldcon), also known as Denvention 3, was held on 6–10 August 2008 at the Colorado Convention Center and the Sheraton Denver Downtown Hotel in Denver, Colorado, United States.

The organizing committee was chaired by Kent Bloom.

Participants 

Attendance was 3,751.

Guests of Honor 

 Lois McMaster Bujold
 Rick Sternbach (artist)
 Tom Whitmore (fan)
 Kathy Mar (music)
 Robert A. Heinlein (ghost of honor)
 Wil McCarthy (toastmaster)

Other participants 

In addition to the Guests of Honor, the convention has announced the names of the people participating in the convention program.

Awards

2008 Hugo Awards 

 Best Novel: The Yiddish Policemen's Union by Michael Chabon
 Best Novella: "All Seated on the Ground" by Connie Willis
 Best Novelette: "The Merchant and the Alchemist's Gate" by Ted Chiang
 Best Short Story: "Tideline" by Elizabeth Bear
 Best Related Book: Brave New Words by Jeff Prucher
 Best Dramatic Presentation, Long Form: Stardust, written by Jane Goldman & Matthew Vaughn, directed by Matthew Vaughn.
 Best Dramatic Presentation, Short Form: Doctor Who: Blink, written by Steven Moffat, directed by Hettie MacDonald.
 Best Professional Editor, Long Form: David G. Hartwell
 Best Professional Editor, Short Form: Gordon Van Gelder
 Best Professional Artist: Stephan Martinière
 Best Semiprozine: Locus, edited by Charles N. Brown, Kirsten Gong-Wong & Liza Groen Trombi
 Best Fanzine: File 770, edited by Mike Glyer
 Best Fan Writer: John Scalzi
 Best Fan Artist: Brad Foster

Other awards 

 John W. Campbell Award for Best New Writer: Mary Robinette Kowal
 Special Committee Awards (not a Hugo Award): NASA, NESFA Press

Worldcon site selection 

At L.A.con IV, Denver won the right to host the 66th Worldcon, on the third ballot by 12 votes in one of the closest races in Worldcon site selection history.

The members of Denvention 3 selected Melbourne as the hosting city for the 68th World Science Fiction Convention, to be held in 2010.

See also 

 Hugo Award
 Science fiction
 Speculative fiction
 World Science Fiction Society
 Worldcon

References

External links 

 Denvention 3 - the 66th Worldcon
 Underrated Science Fiction & Fantasy Panel Films List

2008 conferences
2008 in Colorado
2008 in the United States
Culture of Denver
Science fiction conventions in the United States
Worldcon